Tigra (Greer Grant Nelson) is a superheroine appearing in American comic books published by Marvel Comics. Created by writer-editor Roy Thomas and artist Wally Wood (Marie Severin was then brought in to help layout the art), with her early adventures written by Linda Fite, the character first appeared as the superpowered and gadget-wielding crime fighter the Cat in The Claws of the Cat #1 (November 1972). She mutated into the super powered tiger-woman Tigra in Giant-Size Creatures #1 (July 1974), by writer Tony Isabella and artist Don Perlin.

Publication history
The Cat was introduced in one of a trio of Marvel Comics aimed at a female audience, alongside Night Nurse and Shanna the She-Devil. Marvel writer-editor Roy Thomas recalled in 2007:

The series lasted four issues, each with a different art team. Severin was teamed with acclaimed 1950s EC Comics artist Wally Wood as inker for the premiere, followed by Severin and inker Jim Mooney in issue #2; newcomer Paty Greer  co-penciling with 1940s Golden Age of Comic Books legend Bill Everett, who also inked, in issue #3; and Jim Starlin and Alan Weiss co-penciling the finale, with Frank McLaughlin inking. A fifth issue of the series was drawn by Ramona Fradon, but the title was cancelled due to lack of sales on previous issues. Severin attributes the character's sensual appearance to Wood: "I remember saying, 'My God, I drew this woman and Wally inked her like she's wrapped in Saran Wrap.' His storytelling always had lovely inking, nice blacks and everything, but I didn't have her that revealing. The boys loved his work, though."

The Cat appeared alongside Spider-Man in Marvel Team-Up #8 (April 1973) during her series' brief run. After a year's absence, she was revamped as the superpowered, part-animal Tigra in a two-part story in Giant-Size Creatures #1 (July 1974; "Giant-Size" refers to the comic's page-count, not giant creatures) and Werewolf by Night #20 (Aug. 1974). Writer Tony Isabella recounted "My memory may be a bit shaky here, but I recall the Giant-Size books were approved and put on the schedule without a lot of lead time...I think I got the assignment one day, pitched the idea on the next, and one day later was sitting down with Roy [Thomas] and Gil Kane to work out what Tigra would look like." He also names Don Perlin and John Romita, Sr. as having a hand in Tigra's appearance, and credits Thomas with coming up with the name. Tigra made her solo-feature debut with a 15-page story in the black-and-white horror-comics magazine Monsters Unleashed #10 (Feb. 1975), followed by a brief run in the umbrella series Marvel Chillers #3-7 (Feb.-Oct. 1976), and one more solo story in Marvel Premiere #42 (June 1978). Like The Claws of the Cat, Marvel Chillers was also cancelled due to struggling sales.

Tigra went on to guest star throughout the Marvel line, often appearing in issues of the superhero-team comic The Avengers and later in the cast of the spin-off comic West Coast Avengers. She starred in the four-issue miniseries Tigra (May-Aug. 2002) by writer Christina Z. and artist Mike Deodato, and has since guest starred in She-Hulk, Civil War, various Avengers comics, and elsewhere.

Tigra appeared as a supporting character in Avengers Academy from issue #1 (Aug. 2010) to its final issue, #39 (Jan. 2013).

Fictional character biography

The Cat

Greer Grant was a native of Chicago, Illinois. She was a sophomore at the University of Chicago when she met her future husband, policeman Bill Nelson. She left college to marry him. The marriage was a strong one, flawed only by Bill's overprotective nature. Bill was killed in an off-duty shooting, and Greer had to find a job of her own. After weeks of searching, she ran into her old physics professor, Dr. Joanne Tumulo, and signed on as her research assistant.

Dr. Tumulo was working on human enhancement methods effective for women. For several reasons, including distrust for the haphephobic Malcolm Donalbain (Tumulo's financial backer), distaste for Shirlee Bryant (his chosen subject), and Greer's own enthusiasm, Tumolo decided to let her friend undergo the treatment as well.

Greer emerged from the regimen with greatly enhanced physical and mental capabilities, including the peculiar tendency to feel others' pain. Shirlee emerged with similar physical capacity but considerably less mental empowerment, a result they blamed on her lack of adherence to the preparatory regimen.

Tumolo then investigated further, and discovered that Donalbain had created a mind-control device and a set of cat-themed gadgets, with which he intended to make Shirlee his mindless superhuman enforcer. However, she fell to her death while testing the grapple-claw.

Stealing away, Dr. Tumulo presented the story to Greer, along with a spare Cat costume and gadget-set as evidence. However, her intention to call the police was thwarted by a bombing at her lab, which claimed her life.
Greer then donned the suit, and set out to put an end to his scheme. With her powers, she adapted quickly to the strange garb and attacked Donalbain's headquarters, before convincing him to commit suicide rather than let himself be touched. A fire set off by the earlier fight then destroyed Donalbain's headquarters, including his copy of the enhancement machine.

Greer then embarked on a brief crimefighting career as the Cat.

Years later, another of Donalbain's Cat costumes surfaced when Patsy Walker discovered it while accompanying the Avengers. Donning it, she began calling herself the Hellcat.

Tigra
"The Tigra" is the historical defender/champion of the Cat People, a humanoid race created by sorcery during the Dark Ages. Concerned about the Cat People's uncontrollable population growth and savagery, a community of sorcerers eventually banished the entire original Cat People population to a demonic netherworldly realm.

The two very first Cat People, who were themselves very capable scientists and sorcerers, were able to evade banishment through their magic. They continued to live among humanity in secret and worked to refine the Cat People's biology to make a peaceful integration into the human population possible. They were constantly persecuted and required a protector. Discovering that the original spell for transforming cats into Cat People like themselves had been rendered inoperative, they created a process combining science, sorcery, and focused mental power that could transform a human female into a "Tigra", a humanoid tiger-like being with abilities that far surpassed those of either race.

This unnamed first Tigra defended the Cat People with great effectiveness, and allowed a new community to establish themselves on Earth, separate from the group that had been banished. This new population continued to live amongst humanity in secrecy through the present day, relying on enchantments that cast the illusion of a human appearance.

Nothing is known about the other Tigras who may have existed, or even if there have been more than two. At the time when Greer was transformed into Tigra, "the Tigra" was only remembered by the Cat People as a distant, but powerful, legend. It has been strongly implied that only one Tigra can exist at any given time.

Dr. Tumulo was revealed to be one of these modern Cat People. When members of HYDRA tracked Tumolo down to obtain "the Final Secret" (the Black Death plague, which was another creation of the first two Cat People), Greer once again donned the Cat costume and drove them off. However, she was mortally injured by a blast from one of their alpha radiation pistols.

Greer regained consciousness in a Baja California cave, surrounded by a gathering of Cat People summoned by Tumolo. Rapidly dying from the radiation's effects, Greer was offered one last hope of survival: a combination of ancient science, sorcery, and mental power that would transform her into Tigra, the Cat People's legendary half-human, half-cat warrior. She readily consented, began wearing only her black bikini from this time on, and arose from the ceremony as a superhumanly-powered human-animal hybrid. Striped fur covered her entire body, her hands and feet bore razor-sharp claws, her teeth became long and pointed, and her eyes were now cat's eyes. In addition to superhuman strength and senses, she also gained many of the drives and instincts of a cat. Soon after, she encountered the Werewolf.

Though initially unable to change back to her human self, Tigra received from the Cat People a mystical cat-headed amulet that allowed her to first create the illusion of her human form and later to change at will. She seldom made use of it, preferring her feline superpowered form and mostly abandoning her life as Greer Grant Nelson.

Greer resumed her superhero career, with most of the world unaware that the woman who briefly fought crime as the Cat was now the feline Tigra. She fought alongside most of Marvel's heavy-hitters in wide-ranging adventures. She first battled Kraven the Hunter, and then teamed with Spider-Man against Kraven. She also became a friend and associate of the Fantastic Four.

When the Avengers found themselves shorthanded, Moondragon used her mental powers to compel a dozen unaffiliated heroes (apparently selected at random) to travel to Avengers Mansion and audition for the vacant position. Though he disapproved of Moondragon's methods, Captain America offered Tigra a spot on the team.

Although Tigra's first tenure with the Avengers was brief, she served well. She also aided the X-Men against Deathbird. Her time with the Avengers was highlighted by her saving the world from destruction by the Molecule Man single-handed, who intended to consume the planet's energy, like Galactus. Alone among the Avengers, she was able to get close enough to him to talk him out of his plan. She convinced him to seek help from a therapist and the Molecule Man has ceased to be a threat to this day.

The Avengers fought the Ghost Rider, who blasted the team with his terror-inducing hellfire. The nature of Tigra's powers caused her to be affected by the exposure on a far deeper level than her teammates. She was left with great self-doubts about her qualifications as a member of Earth's premier superhero team, particularly alongside such heavy-hitters as Thor and Iron Man. Ultimately she resigned her membership, leaving the team on good terms.

She resumed her modeling career, moving to San Francisco when employers on the East Coast proved unreceptive to the idea of a cat person model. There she befriended private investigator Jessica Drew, and aided her on several cases, but had no better luck with modeling work there than on the East Coast and accepted an offer from the Vision to become a founding member of the Avengers' new West Coast-based team. Alongside the new West Coast Avengers, she fought Graviton, and became a close friend of Wonder Man. She also began a flirtation with Henry Pym.

While with the West Coast Avengers, she seemed to have shed the remainders of her hellfire-induced self-doubt. However, the cat-like aspects of her personality (such as a penchant for savagery and a need for affection) had begun to dominate her human intellect, causing her increasing distress. She sought help from her Avengers teammates in overcoming the "cat" side of her personality, which had caused her to become the lover of both Wonder Man and Henry Pym. She also encountered and fought the Werewolf. She was transported with the West Coast Avengers by Balkatar to the realm of the Cat People. Ultimately, she came into contact with the banished colony of Cat People, whose king agreed to resolve her crisis in exchange for carrying out her historical function by murdering the Cat People's longtime foe, Master Pandemonium. Though she initially accepted their terms, when the critical moment came at an arena in the Cat People's realm, Tigra refused to violate the Avengers' code against killing, and failed to kill Master Pandemonium. The Cat People stripped her of her "Tigra soul" (the peculiar articulation of her Tigra powers in this demonic realm). She was reduced to her normal, pre-transformation human state.

The Hellcat, who had accompanied Greer and the West Coast Avengers, lent Greer the super-suit that she used to wear as the Cat, and a battle ensued. As the tide began to turn against the Cat People, their leader released the "Tigra soul" as a means of confusing Greer. The tactic backfired: the cat-suit had been designed by a Cat Person (Tumolo) specifically to amplify Greer's human capabilities, so instead of Greer being dominated by the "Tigra soul" as before, the suit caused her human and feline personalities to successfully integrate together.

This time, Greer's transformation into the legendary cat-warrior was much more complete than before. Her strength and abilities were far greater than they were originally. Her appearance became more feline, and she grew a tail like the rest of the Cat People. She also lost the ability to shift back to a human form, though as before she showed no sense of loss for her human identity.

Her transformation was so complete and the Tigra legend was so strong among the Cat People that they immediately ceased hostilities. Tigra continues to hold a position of significant reverence among the Cat People.

The transformation also resolved the conflicts between the human and feline aspects of her personality. Tigra could now exploit the full range and ferocity of her abilities without fear of going so far that she would lose control of her actions, and she could also indulge her natural feline inclinations (such as hunting and chasing prey for enjoyment) without feeling guilty or self-conscious. This integration was confirmed in concrete ways immediately upon the team's return to Earth. Tigra performed a sport dive off the highest span of the Golden Gate Bridge, exhibiting no signs of any injury or fear of the water. She also terminated her ongoing relationship with Hank Pym, explaining that although she no longer felt a cat-like need to seek affection at every opportunity, she had no conventional human desire to be tied down to one mate, either.

She was captured by Graviton at one point, but freed the Avengers from him. Around this time, the Arthurian Lady of the Lake summoned the West Coast Avengers to England to aid the superhero team Excalibur. With the others, Tigra ventured into the realm of limbo to help stop Doctor Doom's mad plans to gain power at the cost of killing everyone in Britain.

Tigra briefly left the West Coast Avengers in a dispute over the Avengers' policy against killing. Tigra stated that she believed by her very nature that killing prey was sometimes necessary. She joined Mockingbird and the Moon Knight in forming an independent group.

After returning to the team, Tigra inexplicably underwent another "inversion" and transformed into a more animal-like feline form, losing her human intellect completely and becoming a danger to her fellow Avengers. This was possibly due to the reality-warping machinations of Immortus, who at the time sought to distract the team so as to have unimpeded access to the Scarlet Witch. Tigra was forcibly shrunken down to sub-house cat size by Hank Pym and kept in a cage in his lab while the team tended to other urgent matters. She escaped and traveled into suburbia, where she lived as a wild animal. She was ultimately rescued and restored to her former appearance and stability by noted witch Agatha Harkness, who was an associate of the West Coast Avengers at the time.

Tigra resumed her membership in the West Coast Avengers. On an intelligence-gathering mission in Japan, she and Iron Man battled a team of Asian supervillains known as the Pacific Overlords. During the fight, Iron Man was incapacitated and Tigra suffered a deep, critical stab wound to the abdomen before dispatching her attackers and making her escape. She flew away in the Avengers' Quinjet, intending to report back to headquarters on the Overlords' plans, but severe loss of blood caused her to lose consciousness and crash land in Arnhem Land, an Aboriginal territory in northern Australia. Rescued by Aborigines, she decided to stay put while she recovered from her wounds, naming Spider-Woman (Julia Carpenter) as her replacement. She briefly made Arnhem Land her home, enjoying the company of the Aborigines and the pleasures of living wild.

After the West Coast Avengers disbanded, Tigra resumed her wide-ranging adventures. Though no longer an active Avenger, she continued to participate in Avengers operations when needed as a member of the team's extended family.

With the aid of a new transformation device to disguise her true identity from her fellow officers, Tigra spent some time on the New York City police force. She focused much of her time on a personal case and in combating a force of vigilante police officers.

Later, mystical forces which attacked all Avengers brought her to the Avengers Mansion. There, she and all the other Avengers were entrapped by Morgan le Fay, to live out in an alternate universe where le Fay ruled, fighting alongside the others as one of the "queen"'s guards under the name "Grimalkin". After the defeat of Morgan, Tigra went off into space with Starfox to enjoy the pleasures found there. She appeared off and on, having a series of adventures as part of the ad hoc space-faring Avengers Infinity team in which she helps in preventing an extra-universal race from destroying all life in our universe.

Tigra returned to Earth with the Avengers Infinity team during the Maximum Security storyline, during which she helped to save the Earth from becoming a penal colony for alien criminals. She played a particularly crucial role in events when the Infinity team were captured after discovering the Kree's role in recent events, with the Kree intending to lobotomize the team and make it appear as though they had destroyed another planet; due to the attention the Kree had paid to keeping the more powerful team members contained, they were unprepared for Tigra, the weakest member, to escape her bonds by returning to her smaller human form, allowing her to escape her shackles and free her teammates in time to reveal the truth.

Civil War
Tigra fought along Iron Man's side during the Civil War. She supported the Superhuman Registration Act, although she expressed sincere concern about the fate of Captain America and the other heroes who opposed the Act and turned fugitive. Nonetheless, in Civil War Files, Tigra was listed not merely as having registered to comply with the law, but also as having become an agent of S.H.I.E.L.D. to actively aid in its enforcement.

Pretending to switch allegiances, she infiltrated Captain America's Secret Avengers team as a mole. She passed information to Iron Man undetected until the very end of the conflict, when she was discovered and "outed" by Hulkling, Captain America's own spy among the pro-registration forces. Captain America kept quiet, exploiting her presence to feed disinformation to Iron Man about his team's plan to rescue imprisoned heroes later that day.

The Initiative
Greer has been identified as one of the 142 registered superheroes who are part of the Fifty State Initiative. She served as a founding instructor at Camp Hammond, the training compound for the Initiative, and resumed her romantic relationship with fellow superhero Yellowjacket, unaware that he had been kidnapped and replaced by a Skrull duplicate.

Tigra was captured by Chilean soldiers controlled by the Puppet Master, who sculpted a figure in her likeness and thus put her under his mental control. He used her and the other superhuman women he had enslaved (including Stature, Dusk, Araña, and Silverclaw) as elite guards at his South American base of operations. Tigra and the rest of the heroes were restored to their normal free will when Ms. Marvel and her S.H.I.E.L.D. strike team liberated the compound and killed the Puppet Master.

Later she was shot and severely beaten by the Hood in her home in retaliation for having beaten Jigsaw, a member of his fledgling super-criminal organization. While Tigra was incapacitated, the Hood threatened the life of her mother, and Jigsaw stole the mystic talisman she occasionally uses to transform to her human identity.

The Hood and his entire crew later appeared at her apartment, demanding to know the location of the New Avengers' secret headquarters. Tigra intentionally gave him information that led them into an ambush. She joined in the battle and personally beat down the Hood, saving the life of Iron Fist in the process. By the time of the Hood's second appearance in her apartment, she had completely recovered from her injuries and had either reacquired her talisman or replaced it with a close facsimile.

Tigra continued to serve in the Initiative as a senior staff member of the central organization, and was the leader of the Arkansas Initiative team "the Battalion,", until the Initiative was taken over by Norman Osborn and she learned of the Hood's role as his right-hand man. She has also appeared as a member of She-Hulk's "Lady Liberators" team.

After the Skrull invasion, Tigra reveals to the Hellcat and Trauma that she believes herself to be pregnant by Yellowjacket, though she is unsure if the baby is the real Hank's or the Skrull impostor's. She tells Trauma that she has decided to terminate the pregnancy regardless of the father's identity. She later decides to leave the camp for Arkansas, planning to train Razorback, who had been replaced by a Skrull and recently returned, and was eager to take the impostor's place in the Battalion. When she was nearly injured by Ragnarok's hammer, she seemed to show concern for the baby.

When Norman Osborn told her that he was going to take her baby for genetic testing and that moreover he had made the Hood the chief operating officer of the Initiative, Tigra went on the run with Gauntlet despite having been offered her choice of prestige assignments as a registered hero. She co-founded the Avengers Resistance, choosing its name as a means of restoring honor to the legendary team's traditions. Now wanted as an outlaw, she began exacting personal vengeance on members of the Hood's gang, starting by savagely attacking and beating one of the Brothers Grimm inside his home. She serves as the team's de facto leader.

Tigra is later approached by Ultra Girl, asking why she and the Avengers Resistance are going after the villains in the Initiative. In response, she shows her a video of the Hood savagely beating her. Now, she wants to get back at them, by showing them that they are vulnerable...by making them scared and broken. Tigra later ambushes Mandrill.

She claimed her final retribution against the Hood not on the battlefield, but after he was rendered powerless and taken into custody. After telling him that she was perfectly comfortable with the idea of taking his life, the sight of his baby in the hallway outside convinced her that dooming him to either a life in prison or on the run would be a far worse punishment, as he would never get to hold his child ever again; and to kill him would jeopardize her future with her own baby. Tigra gave birth to what is apparently a normal Cat Person kitten during the transition between Tony Stark's administration of the Initiative and Norman Osborn's; the gestation period was a mere two months, due to her feline physiology. She hid the infant from Osborn, entrusting its care to the Cat People until the end of hostilities. She named the child William, after her late husband.

Heroic Age
At the conclusion of the Siege, Tigra stated a new motivation not only to restore the good name of the Avengers, but also to ensure that her child will grow up in a safer world.

Following the arrest and incarceration of Norman Osborn, the dismantling of his criminal superhero teams, and the repeal of the Superhuman Registration Act, the President names Steve Rogers (the original Captain America) as America's new head of national security. Rogers seeks to assemble a collection of heroes to inspire the nation and the world as a new organization of Avengers. Tigra is among the 25 heroes he personally invites to join him in creating a new Heroic Age.

Alongside Hank Pym, Quicksilver, Jocasta, Speedball and Justice, Tigra serves as part of the founding faculty of Avengers Academy, training a new generation of heroes in the traditions of the world's elite superhero team.

During this time, Tigra learns that the Skrull posing as Pym was indeed William's father, but as he had disguised himself as Pym at the genetic level, it means that William is half-human, rather than half-Skrull, with Pym technically being the genetic father. After learning this, Tigra asks Pym to take care of William in the event of anything happening to her.

When a former associate of The Hood plans to release the video of Tigra's beating commercially, Tigra arranges to have the footage air in its entirety during a live interview, so that her own experience may serve as an example to other trauma survivors and inspire them to seek help. During this same interview, she announces her formation of a series of "Always an Avenger" centers to provide veterans, children, spouses and any other trauma victims with needed counseling and resources.

Members of the existing Avengers Academy class react to the initial news of the video by tracking the unpowered Hood down, attacking him, and releasing video of the attack on the Internet, rather than taking the escaped Hood into custody and returning him to jail. Tigra becomes furious at their counter-heroic actions and by their refusal to appreciate the seriousness of their transgression; she summarily expels all those involved. Later, after talking with the rest of the faculty staff, they decide to put all those involved on probation instead.

She has slowly grown closer to Henry Pym and the two have resumed their romantic relationship.

Tigra was one of 10 female heroes recruited by Misty Knight to aid her and the Valkyrie in repelling a group of Asgardian Doom Maidens. At the end of this adventure, the Valkyrie comes to realize that Tigra and three of the other heroines are among those deemed by the All-Mother to be worthy to become shield-maidens like herself, symbols of honor and valor and courage, to one day be led by the Valkyrie into battle and death.

During the Secret Empire storyline, Tigra appears as a member of the Underground which is a resistance movement against HYDRA ever since they took over the United States.

Tigra appeared in the Fresh Start revival of the West Coast Avengers, in which she had been changed into a giant 200-Foot tall woman with her mind set in a feral state. After the new West Coast Avengers roster defeated her, they worked on stopping other feral giant women mutated into such by M.O.D.O.K. in his failed quest for love. Once returned to her original self, she thanked the WCA, went to hunt M.O.D.O.K. and wished the new WCA the best of luck. During the 17th birthday party for Nadia van Dyne-Pym, the long lost daughter of Hank Pym, Tigra introduced William to Nadia as her half-brother. With the introduction serving as her birthday gift, Tigra had tears of joy that Nadia happily accepted her new brother and would be a big part in William's life.

Powers and abilities
Tigra's powers are the result of a combination of science, magic, and mental energy utilized by Dr. Joanne Marie Tumulo and the other Cat People. Her physical appearance is distinctly cat-like. A thick, sleek coat of orange fur with black stripes covers her entire body. She has pointed ears, sharper-than-normal teeth with pronounced upper and lower canines, eyes with enlarged irises and vertically slitted pupils, and retractable claws on her feet and hands instead of nails. Her claws and teeth are sufficiently strong to puncture sheet steel, such as that found in a car body. Tigra also has a long semi-prehensile tail, and can willfully contact (but not grasp and lift) objects with it. Tigra's feline physiology grants her various superhuman attributes including superhuman strength, speed, stamina, agility, reflexes, and resistance to physical injury. If she is injured, her physiology enables her to heal much faster and more extensively than an ordinary human.

Tigra's senses of sight, smell, and hearing extend far into the superhuman range and are also superior to those of ordinary cats. Tigra can see farther, and with much greater clarity, than an ordinary human. She has this same level of clarity at night, and her vision also extends slightly into the infrared spectrum, allowing her to see in complete darkness.

Her hearing is similarly enhanced, allowing her to hear a wider range of frequencies than a normal human as well as clearly hear sounds that would be far too faint for a human to detect. Exposure to intense, high-frequency sound is far more painful for Tigra than a normal human.

Tigra's sense of smell is developed to the point that she can recognize a person by scent alone, and track an individual across great distances and through complex environments. She can also sense changes in a person's mood through changes in their scent.

Thick pads on her feet, combined with her natural grace, allow her to move in almost complete silence.

Tigra's thick coat of fur prevents her from losing body heat quickly. She has stated that she wears bikinis partly because a full set of clothes over her fur would cause her to overheat in warm environments and possibly pass out. In addition, she is completely comfortable with her feline appearance and is not annoyed by the inevitable attention.

The unusual feline-human hybrid configuration of her brain makes her somewhat resistant to telepathic assaults. Though Tigra is not immune to such tactics, attackers have been forced to focus their powers carefully in order to use them effectively against her.

Like all cats, the interconnective tissues of Tigra's skeleton are unusually resilient. On at least one occasion this allowed her to shift her bones to slip out of mechanical restraints that would have effectively held a normal human, though doing so was quite painful. This resiliency also contributes to many of her other super-powered abilities, such as her body's resistance to injury.

Tigra possesses a mystical talisman that allows her to change her appearance from feline to human at will. She rarely uses it and only appears in her human form whenever circumstances require it. She regards her feline body as her natural form.

She formerly possessed what was referred to as a "cat-soul" in addition to her "human soul". Though vaguely defined, her "two souls" were consistently depicted merely as a means to describe her conflicting human and feline instincts, and not as separate personalities or personas, and her "cat soul" was not the soul of any specific Cat Person from the past. Regardless of the definition of her "two souls", they were fully merged during Greer's second, more complete transformation into the legendary figure.

Greer received a form of empathic ability when she became the Cat. She retains this ability as Tigra. With careful concentration, she can sense the emotions of others within her immediate proximity. She appears to prefer to achieve this same effect through her enhanced feline senses.

Tigra is an experienced and formidable hand-to-hand combatant, with a unique fighting style that exploits her feline speed, agility, senses, and instincts. She is a superhumanly adept athlete and gymnast. Like all Avengers of her generation, she has sparred and trained extensively with Steve Rogers, the original Captain America.

She is also a capable leader and pilot, qualified to operate Avengers aircraft as well as interstellar spacecraft.

While working undercover in human guise, Tigra attended the New York Police Academy to investigate the decade-old murder of her husband Bill Nelson. After bringing the murderers to justice, she completed her training under her Greer Grant Nelson identity. While she does not serve as an active-duty police officer, she retains legal authority under both her civilian and superpowered identities and unofficial ties to the police community.

Tigra possesses mystical abilities that have largely gone unexplored. In addition to using her mystic talisman to change her appearance from feline to human and back, she has been shown magically summoning the Balkatar, the Cat People's designated emissary to the Earthly plane. When Dr. Strange abdicated his position as Sorcerer Supreme, the Eye of Agamotto created a vision showing the many mystic beings who were potentially worthy and/or capable of assuming the title. An image of Tigra was included in this vision.

Tigra's physiology is more feline than human. When she became pregnant via the Skrull pretending to be Hank Pym, she carried the baby to term in two months, producing a single Cat Person son named William after her late husband. William does not have any traces of Skrull DNA as the Skrull pretending to be Hank Pym imitated him down to a cellular level; thus, genetically, William is Hank Pym's son. William matures more quickly than a human baby would.

Other versions

Spidey Super Stories
Greer Nelson appears as the Cat in several issues of this comic, which was designed for young readers as a joint project with the PBS series The Electric Company. The Cat always appears in her costumed identity and is apparently based in New York City. She helps Spider-Man in several adventures, capturing villains like the Owl and Thanos. The second adventure is notorious among comic book fans for its portrayal of Thanos. He and the Cat are both looking for the Cosmic Cube. When Thanos gets hold of the powerful artifact, he attempts to flee in a helicopter with his name written on the side. Spider-Man and the Cat bring down the helicopter and recover the Cube. The story ends with the NYPD taking Thanos away in handcuffs.

Marvel Adventures
Tigra also exists in the alternative "all-ages" version of the Marvel Universe. Though identical in appearance to the main-universe Tigra, she wears a more modest suit which covers more of her torso than her familiar bikini. She is working as an independent private investigator when a masked man, purporting to be a famous author researching a book about the Avengers, hires Tigra to secretly trail and collect information about its members. After two weeks of following individual Avengers and attempting to avoid detection, she observes the team fighting a losing battle against the Griffin. She leaps in to join the fray. The Griffin is subdued with her help and the team reveals to Tigra that her mysterious client was actually Spider-Man; the assignment was merely a ruse designed to evaluate her potential as an Avenger. She is offered a spot on the team and eagerly accepts.

House Of M
In the House of M reality in which Magneto rules the world and mutants are the dominant species, Tigra exploits her feline appearance to "pass" as a mutant. She operates unnoticed in mainstream mutant society on behalf of pro-human groups, first as a member of the Sapien Liberation Army and then as a founding member of Luke Cage's underground "Avengers" team, as well as becoming his lover. During an FBI ambush set up by Misty Knight, Tigra spots the Taskmaster taking aim at Cage from a distant rooftop and leaps into the line of fire. She takes the bullet, saving Cage's life, and dies at the scene.

Marvel Mangaverse
She also appears in the "Marvel Mangaverse" alternate reality as Dr. Strange's assistant/familiar, bound by a magical curse that keeps her in werecat form until she completes 1,000 good deeds. She survives the first and second volumes of the Marvel Mangaverse series, but is murdered within the first few pages of the third and final volume; New Mangaverse: The Rings of Fate.

Marvel Zombies
In the Marvel Zombies continuity, Tigra as a zombie is seen in Ultimate Fantastic Four #23. She is part of a huge group of superpowered zombies who have learned of the existence of a trio of humans. The humans are successfully rescued by this universe's Magneto and the Ultimate Fantastic Four. Later, Zombie Tigra and Zombie Shamrock encounter a trio of travelers from mainstream Marvel continuity: Deadpool and two A.I.M. scientists. Zombie Tigra is partially obliterated by the scientists' firearms.

Ultimate Marvel
The Ultimate Marvel universe version of Tigra appeared as a member of the West Coast Ultimates. She was originally a young police officer named Marie Grant who, after being convicted of using excessive force, was sentenced to 20 years in prison. Nick Fury secured Marie's release on the condition that she joined his new team of Ultimates, which led to S.H.I.E.L.D. scientists granting her superhuman abilities.

Infinity Warps
In Warp World, a copy of the Marvel Universe when it was folded in half during the Infinity Wars storyline, Tigra was fused with the Wendigo, creating the Wentigra. Greer Baptise was a detective who was mortally wounded by a gunshot and was retrieved by a cult known as the Cat People. In order for her to survive, they offered her to eat human meat, which cursed her into becoming the Wentigra. She was then unwillingly cured by Weapon Hex (a fusion of X-23 and the Scarlet Witch).

Reception

Accolades 

 In 2011, Comics Buyer's Guide ranked Tigra 61st in their "100 Sexiest Women in Comics" list.
 In 2018, The Mary Sue ranked Tigra 4th in their "7 Female Superheroes Who Should Join Marvel’s Cinematic Universe" list.
 In 2021, CBR.com ranked Tigra 17th in their "20 Most Powerful Female Members Of The Avengers" list.
 In 2022, Screen Rant included Tigra in their "10 Iconic West Coast Avengers" list, in their "10 Best Street-Level Heroes Not Yet In The MCU" list, and in their "10 Most Powerful Members Of The Lady Liberators" list.
 In 2022, CBR.com ranked Tigra 3rd in their "10 Best Cat-Themed Superheroes In Comics" list.

In other media

Television
 Tigra appears in The Avengers: United They Stand, voiced by Lenore Zann. This version was an athlete who underwent genetic treatments to give her a competitive edge, but was left resembling an anthropomorphic tiger and gained superhuman abilities. Following this, she became a member of the Avengers.
 Hulu intended to air a Tigra & Dazzler animated series to be written and executive produced by Erica Rivinoja and Chelsea Handler. Additionally, the two would have also teamed up with MODOK, Hit-Monkey, and Howard the Duck in the animated special The Offenders. In December 2019 however, Rivinoja and the entire writing staff were fired due to creative differences, though Handler was still attached to the project. In January 2020, it was announced that Tigra & Dazzler, along with the Howard the Duck series, was cancelled, making The Offenders unlikely.

Film
The Avengers: United They Stand depiction of Tigra appears in Chip 'n Dale: Rescue Rangers, voiced by Liz Cackowski. She is a washed-up actress whose main source of income is convention appearances.

Video games
 Tigra appears in Hawkeye's ending in Ultimate Marvel vs. Capcom 3 as a member of his West Coast Avengers.
 Tigra appears as a playable character in Marvel Super Hero Squad Online, voiced by Grey DeLisle.
 Tigra appears as a playable character in Marvel: Avengers Alliance.
 Tigra appears as a playable character in Lego Marvel's Avengers.
 A teenage version of Tigra appears in Marvel Avengers Academy, voiced by Bella Thorne.

Miscellaneous
Tigra appears in The Avengers: United They Stand tie-in comic book series.

Toys and collectibles
 In 2006, Bowen Designs released a Tigra mini-bust sculpted by Jim Maddox and based largely on a 2001 sketch by Sean Chen.
 An action figure based on the Avengers: United They Stand incarnation of Tigra was released as part of a line of the Toy Biz "Avengers United" tie-in toy line in 2000.
 A Tigra action figure reworked from a preexisting Black Cat figure was released as part of Toy Biz's Marvel Hall of Fame: She-Force line in 1997.
 In 2009, Hasbro released a Tigra action figure as part of their Marvel Legends line, reflecting her appearance in current mainstream Marvel continuity.
 In 2021, Hasbro released an updated Tigra figure as part of their retro carded line, representing her time with the West Coast Avengers.

Collected editions

References

External links
 Tigra at Marvel.com
 The Tigra Gallery
 Tigra at Don Markstein's Toonopedia
 The Unofficial Handbook of Marvel Comics Creators
 

Avengers (comics) characters
Characters created by Gil Kane
Characters created by John Romita Sr.
Characters created by Roy Thomas
Characters created by Stan Lee
Characters created by Tony Isabella
Characters created by Wally Wood
Comics characters introduced in 1972
Fictional characters from Chicago
Fictional characters with superhuman senses
Fictional werecats
Marvel Comics characters who can move at superhuman speeds
Marvel Comics characters who use magic
Marvel Comics characters with accelerated healing
Marvel Comics characters with superhuman strength
Marvel Comics female superheroes
Marvel Comics martial artists
Marvel Comics mutates